This is a list of highways in Arkansas.

Interstate highways
Interstate 30
Interstate 40
Interstate 49
Interstate 55
Interstate 57 (proposed)
Interstate 69 (proposed)
Interstate 130 (former proposal)
Interstate 430
Interstate 440
Interstate 530
Interstate 540
Interstate 555
Interstate 630
Interstate 730 (former proposal)

United States highways

Major state highways